Lauren Felice Collins (born August 29, 1986) is a Canadian actress, best known for portraying Paige Michalchuk on Degrassi: The Next Generation. She has also had supporting roles in the films Take the Lead (2006) and Charlie Bartlett (2007). In 2013, she appeared in multiple episodes of the sketch comedy Kroll Show, as well as a recurring guest role in the fourth season of the FX series The Strain (2017).

Early life  
Collins was born in Thornhill, Ontario, the daughter of Sari (née Bresver) and Stan Collins. Her father was born in London, England. Collins was raised Jewish. She has one brother, and her first cousin once-removed is Spencer Rice, one of the stars of Kenny vs Spenny. She is a graduate of Thornlea Secondary School.

Career 
Collins first began acting in 1998, with roles in various television series including Once a Thief, Noddy and I Was a Sixth Grade Alien. From 2000 to 2001, she had a recurring role on In a Heartbeat before landing the role of Paige Michalchuk on Degrassi: The Next Generation in 2001.

She also portrayed Derek's ex-girlfriend Kendra on Life with Derek. She has also appeared in numerous theatrical productions, playing the title roles in Alice in Wonderland and the production of Annie, and starring in the made-for-television film Virtual Mom.

In 2006, Collins made her feature film debut in Take the Lead, appearing alongside Antonio Banderas. The following year she appeared in Charlie Bartlett (starring Anton Yelchin and Robert Downey Jr.). In 2008, she co-starred in the direct-to-DVD feature Picture This, opposite Ashley Tisdale and fellow Degrassi alumnus Shenae Grimes. After YouTube celebrity Shane Dawson expressed his interest in watching the Degrassi series, Collins starred in a parody video released March 6, 2010. She once again worked with Disney Channel and Tisdale on the 2011 High School Musical spin-off feature, Sharpay's Fabulous Adventure, playing the role of Tiffani.

From 2013 to 2014, Collins hosted MTV's 1 Girl 5 Gays replacing Aliya Jasmine Sovani, who had been hosting the show for 4 seasons.

In 2014, she co-wrote and starred in the short film Zero Recognition, directed by Ben Lewis, which premiered at the Toronto International Film Festival. Between 2013 and 2014, Collins appeared in four episodes of the sketch comedy series Kroll Show.

Personal life 
Collins and actor Jonathan Malen married in October 2018. Collins revealed on Instagram that she gave birth to a boy named Charlie Sebastian Malen on March 6, 2020. On January 1st, 2023, she announced via Instagram that she and her husband were expecting another baby, due spring 2023.

Filmography

Film

Television

Music videos

Awards and nominations

References

External links
 

1986 births
20th-century Canadian actresses
21st-century Canadian actresses
Actresses from Ontario
Canadian child actresses
Canadian film actresses
Canadian people of English descent
Canadian stage actresses
Canadian television actresses
Canadian voice actresses
Jewish Canadian actresses
Living people
People from Thornhill, Ontario